A list of films produced in Italy in 1913 (see 1913 in film):

External links
 Italian films of 1913 at the Internet Movie Database

Italian
1913
Films